Protein DGCR6 is a protein that in humans is encoded by the DGCR6 gene.

DiGeorge syndrome, and more widely, the CATCH 22 syndrome, are associated with microdeletions in chromosomal region 22q11.2. This gene product shares homology with the Drosophila melanogaster gonadal protein, which participates in gonadal and germ cell development, and with the human laminin gamma-1 chain, which upon polymerization with alpha- and beta-chains forms the laminin molecule. Laminin binds to cells through interaction with a receptor and has functions in cell attachment, migration, and tissue organization during development. This gene could be a candidate for involvement in the DiGeorge syndrome pathology by playing a role in neural crest cell migration into the third and fourth pharyngeal pouches, the structures from which derive the organs affected in DiGeorge syndrome.

References

Further reading